is a retired Japanese badminton player who was a singles specialist. She was the bronze medalist at the 2013 and 2014 Asian Championships. Takahashi reached a career high as world number 10 in the BWF World Ranking in February 2019.

Personal life 
Takahashi is the younger sister of Ayaka Takahashi, who is a badminton doubles player.

Achievements

Asian Championships
Women's singles

BWF World Tour (4 titles, 2 runners-up) 
The BWF World Tour, which was announced on 19 March 2017 and implemented in 2018, is a series of elite badminton tournaments sanctioned by the Badminton World Federation (BWF). The BWF World Tour is divided into levels of World Tour Finals, Super 1000, Super 750, Super 500, Super 300 (part of the HSBC World Tour), and the BWF Tour Super 100.

Women's singles

BWF Grand Prix (3 titles, 3 runners-up) 
The BWF Grand Prix had two levels, the Grand Prix and Grand Prix Gold. It was a series of badminton tournaments sanctioned by the Badminton World Federation (BWF) and played between 2007 and 2017.

Women's singles

 BWF Grand Prix Gold tournament
 BWF Grand Prix tournament

BWF International Challenge/Series (9 titles) 
Women's singles

 BWF International Challenge tournament
 BWF International Series tournament

Record against selected opponents 
Record against Year-end Finals finalists, World Championships semi-finalists, and Olympic quarter-finalists. Accurate as of 15 March 2022.

References

External links 
 

1992 births
Living people
People from Kashihara, Nara
Sportspeople from Nara Prefecture
Japanese female badminton players
Badminton players at the 2014 Asian Games
Asian Games bronze medalists for Japan
Asian Games medalists in badminton
Medalists at the 2014 Asian Games